Arsenic pentafluoride is a chemical compound of arsenic and fluorine.  It is a toxic, colorless gas. The oxidation state of arsenic is +5.

Synthesis
Arsenic pentafluoride can be prepared by direct combination of arsenic and fluorine:

2As + 5F2 → 2AsF5

It can also be prepared by the reaction of arsenic trifluoride and fluorine:

AsF3 + F2 → AsF5

or the addition of fluorine to arsenic pentoxide or arsenic trioxide.

2As2O5 + 10F2 → 4AsF5 + 5O2
2As2O3 + 10F2 → 4AsF5 + 3O2

Properties
Arsenic pentafluoride is a colourless gas and has a trigonal bipyramidal structure. In the solid state the axial As−F bond lengths are 171.9 pm and the equatorial 166.8 pm.   Its point group is D3h.

Reactions
Arsenic pentafluoride forms halide complexes and is a powerful fluoride acceptor.  An example is the reaction with sulfur tetrafluoride, forming an ionic hexafluoroarsenate complex.

AsF5 + SF4  → SF3+ + AsF6−

Safety
Arsenic pentafluoride is an extremely dangerous toxin, mainly poisoning liver cells. It has a smell that is similar to vinyl chloride gas.

See also
List of highly toxic gases

References

Arsenic(V) compounds
Fluorides
Arsenic halides